Alwinton (previously named "Allenton" and sometimes still referred to as this) is a village and former parish in Northumberland, England. Alwinton is named after the nearby River Alwin, and means farm on the River Alwin.

Alwinton lies at the head of the Coquet valley, on the edge of both the Otterburn Army Training Estate and the Northumberland National Park.

A road continues past Alwinton into the Cheviot Hills where it terminates at the ancient Roman military encampment of Chew Green.

Having no shops, Alwinton's social life centres on the Rose and Thistle Inn, a public house owned by the Latchams. Regular Church of England services are offered at St. Michael and All Angels, which traditionally serves the parish of Alwinton encompassing the nearby townships of Biddlestone, Burradon, Clennell, Fairhaugh, Farnham, Linbriggs, Netherton, Peels, and Sharperton. In the early 21st century several of rural Northumberland's least populated parishes were merged into slightly larger units, and Alwinton was one example, being merged with the neighbouring Biddlestone (where from the Census 2011 the population is included).

Governance 
Alwinton is in the parliamentary constituency of Berwick-upon-Tweed.

Historical population and surnames
Surnames of Alwinton residents during the period 1538 to 1828 gathered from militia lists, parish books, feodary books and poll books include Belany, Bell, Bertram, Bland, Brokyt, Brown, Browne, Burn, Charleton, Clarke, Clavering, Clennell, Davison, Drybrough, Dykson, Foreste, Gibson, Gladstaines, Hall, Handley, Kirkup, Levingstone, Martin, Moses, Myngzies, Nesbit, Nevison, Patonson, Peary, Potts, Pratt, Robson, Scott, Selby, Starbecke, Steynson, Stuart, Thirwall, Trumble, Turnbull, Wallis, Whyt, Widdrington, Wilkinson, Wilson, and Young (Dixon, 1903, pp. 173, 215, 230).

Census records for Alwinton township during the 19th and 20th centuries indicate a gradual decline in population:

Religious sites 
The Parish Church of St. Michael and All Angels, is an early Norman church, and was built on a hillside in the late 11th century or 12th century. Little historical information is available about Alwinton prior to 1245, when the value of its vicarage was first recorded. In 1279, two prisoners escaped from Harbottle castle and fled to the Alwinton church where they confessed to thievery and abjured the realm.

The church building was significantly neglected in the 15th and 16th centuries, to the extent that a Court of High Commission reported "the walls of the church and chancell are in great decay, noe glass in the windowes and noe doores for the church". Major repairs were finally funded and completed in the 1720s. The church was largely rebuilt in the 19th century. The crypt was last used for a burial in 1868 and is now inaccessible. The church is now a Grade II* listed building.

Alwinton Border Shepherds Show
The annual Border Shepherds Show, a traditional agricultural show or fair featuring sheep farming in the borders area of England and Scotland, is held on the second Saturday of October. The Alwinton show is the last agricultural show of the season in the borders area. Traditionally, it marks the end of summer and the time for hill farmers to begin preparations for winter.

Images gallery

References

 Dixon, D. D. (1903). Upper Coquetdale. Reprinted 1987 by Sandhill Press, Alnwick.
 Dodds, M. H. (1940). A history of Northumberland (vol.15). Newcastle upon Tyne: Andrew Reid & Company.

External links 

 Alwinton Village Website
 Alwinton Parish Council
 Local history
 Alwinton on GENUKI
 Alwinton: Historic Village in Northumberland National Park
 Clennell Hall Riverside Holiday Park
 The Rose and Thistle
 St Michael & All Angels Church, Panoramic Photograph of the interior.
 Alwinton Photos
 Northumberland parish index Index of all the parish locations in Northumberland

 
Villages in Northumberland
Civil parishes in Northumberland